Parachondrostoma is a genus of cyprinid fish found mostly in Spain with one species entering France. There are currently four species in this genus.

Species
There are currently four recognized species in this genus:
 Parachondrostoma arrigonis (Steindachner, 1866)
 Parachondrostoma miegii (Steindachner, 1866)
 Parachondrostoma toxostoma (Vallot, 1837)
 Parachondrostoma turiense (Elvira, 1987)

Conservation
According to the IUCN, Parachondrostoma turiense is an endangered species and Parachondrostoma arrigonis is critically endangered. The Parachondrostoma is endangered because the population constantly declines, but it is being protected by the European Natura 2000 Network. The European Natura 2000 Network helps Parachondrostoma by artificially breeding about 1,000 juvenile Parachondrostoma’s.

References

 
Freshwater fish of Europe